The Communauté d'agglomération Creil Sud Oise is a communauté d'agglomération located in the Oise département and in the Hauts-de-France région of France. Its seat is in the town Creil. It was created on 1 January 2017. Its area is 83.5 km2. Its population was 86,512 in 2017, of which 35,657 in Creil proper.

Composition
The communauté d'agglomération consists of the following 11 communes:

Creil
Cramoisy
Maysel
Montataire
Nogent-sur-Oise
Rousseloy
Saint-Leu-d'Esserent
Saint-Maximin
Saint-Vaast-lès-Mello
Thiverny
Villers-Saint-Paul

Demography

See also
 Communes of the Oise department

References

External links

 

Creil Sud Oise
Creil Sud Oise